Rochester and Chatham was a parliamentary constituency in Kent which returned one Member of Parliament (MP) to the House of Commons of the Parliament of the United Kingdom from 1950 until it was abolished for the 1983 general election.

It largely replaced the former Chatham constituency, which had taken some of the previous Rochester seat in 1918. In turn it gave way to the Medway constituency in 1983, which was renamed Rochester and Strood in 2010.

Boundaries
The Municipal Boroughs of Rochester and Chatham.

History
This constituency was a Labour-Tory marginal seat throughout its 33-year existence.

The seat disappeared at the 1983 general election, and its territory was split between two new constituencies; 55.23% of it went to Medway, and 44.77% to Mid Kent.

Members of Parliament

Election results

Elections in the 1950s

Elections in the 1960s

Elections in the 1970s

References

Politics of Medway
Parliamentary constituencies in Kent (historic)
Constituencies of the Parliament of the United Kingdom established in 1950